Home is the sixth studio album by American country music band Dixie Chicks, released on August 27, 2002, through Monument and Columbia Records. It is notable for its acoustic bluegrass sound, which stands in contrast with their previous two country pop albums.

The group was promoting the album when lead singer Natalie Maines made controversial comments about U.S. President George W. Bush criticizing his role in the 2003 invasion of Iraq. The album's third single, "Travelin' Soldier", was #1 on the Billboard Country Chart the week that Maines' comments hit the press. The following week, as many stations started a still-standing boycott of the Chicks' music, the song collapsed. None of their following singles gained traction with country radio.  Despite these events, the album was certified 6× Multi-platinum status by the RIAA and has sold 5,979,000 copies in the United States up to November 2008. The album also featured a cover of Fleetwood Mac's "Landslide", which was their biggest pop crossover hit until 2007, when "Not Ready to Make Nice" peaked at #4 on the Billboard Hot 100.  The album was also successful in Australia, in its 175th week in the country charts it was certified Triple Platinum for shipments of 210,000 copies.

The album was nominated at the 45th Grammy Awards for six awards, including their second attempt for Album of the Year. The group went home with four in 2003, including Best Country Album, Best Recording Package, Best Country Instrumental Performance for "Lil' Jack Slade", and  Best Country Performance by a Duo or Group with Vocal for "Long Time Gone". Additionally, they were nominated for Best Engineered Album, Non-Classical and Darrell Scott was nominated for Best Country Song for Long Time Gone. Two years later, they were nominated and won Best Country Performance by a Duo or Group with Vocal, this time for "Top of the World".  It debuted at #1 on the Billboard Top 200 Albums chart and stayed there for four non-consecutive weeks. It also debuted at #1 on the Billboard Top Country Albums, and stayed there for 12 non-consecutive weeks.

Songs

"Landslide" was originally recorded by Fleetwood Mac in 1975. "Travelin' Soldier" was originally recorded by its writer, Bruce Robison, in 1996, and then in rewritten form, in 1999; Ty England also recorded the song in 1999. "Godspeed" was originally recorded by Radney Foster in 1999; his wife suggested sending it to the Dixie Chicks because Natalie Maines had just had a baby. "Long Time Gone" and "More Love" were originally recorded by Darrell Scott in 2000. "Truth No. 2" and "Top of the World" were originally recorded by Patty Griffin for a 2000 album that went unreleased. "I Believe in Love" made its debut on the 2001 telethon America: A Tribute to Heroes.

Reception

Critical

The album received positive reviews. Metacritic gave the album an aggregated score of 75 (green label), indicating "generally favorable reviews".

Rhapsody ranked the album #1 on its list of "Country's Best Albums of the Decade". Another music blog, Country Universe, named it as the album of the decade. CMT's Craig Shelburne included it on his "A Dozen Favorite Country Albums of the Decade" list.  Engine 145 country music blog lists it No. 4 on the "Top Country Albums of the Decade" list. Entertainment Weekly put the album on its end-of-the-decade, "best-of" list, saying: "Even George W. Bush fans have to respect the Chicks' authentic bluegrass sound on 'Long Time Gone' and 'Landslide'. Okay, maybe they don't. But they should." Allmusic said "They've delivered not just their best album, but what's arguably the best country album yet released in the 2000s. Needless to say, an instant classic."

Accolades 
Rhapsody – #1 on its "Country's Best Albums of the Decade" list
Country Universe – #1 Country Album of the Decade
Country Universe - #2 on its "100 Greatest Contemporary Country Albums" List 
CMT – "A Dozen Favorite Country Albums of the Decade" list
Engine 145 – #4 on its "Top Country Albums of the Decade" list
Entertainment Weekly – #6 Best Album of the Decade
Entertainment Weekly - #2 on its "25 Essential Country Albums" list 
Entertainment Weekly = #85 on its "100 Best Albums from 1983-2008" 
Texas Music Magazine – #1 Album of the Decade
BSC – #67 on its "Best Albums of the Decade" List
CMT – #15 on its Top 40 Greatest Country Albums
Taste of Country - #27 on its "100 Greatest Country Albums Ever" 
9513 - #4 on its "Top Country Albums of the Decade" List

Track listing

Personnel

Martie Maguire - fiddle, mandolin, viola, vocals
Natalie Maines - vocals
Emily Robison - banjo, Dobro, accordion, vocals, Papoose

Additional personnel
Glenn Fukunaga - upright bass
Emmylou Harris - vocals
Byron House - upright bass
Lloyd Maines - acoustic guitar, Weissenborn slide guitar, Papoose 
John Mock - percussion, bodhrán, uilleann pipes, tin whistle
Sara Nelson - cello
Paul Pearcy - percussion
Adam Steffey - mandolin
Bryan Sutton - acoustic guitar, baritone guitar, Papoose
Chris Thile - mandolin, soloist

Production
Producers: Dixie Chicks, Lloyd Maines
Engineer: Gary Paczosa
Assistant engineers: Thomas Johnson, Adam Odor, Fred Remmert
Mixing: Gary Paczosa
Mixing assistant: Eric Bickel
Mastering: Robert Hadley, Doug Sax
Production coordination: Mindi Pelletier
String arrangements: John Mock
Art direction: Kevin Reagan
Design: Bret Healey, Kevin Reagan
Photography: James Minchin
Make-up: Candy Burton

Charts and certifications

Weekly charts

Year-end charts

Certifications

Singles

Other charted songs

Awards
Grammy Awards

References

External links
 

2002 albums
The Chicks albums
Monument Records albums
Columbia Records albums
Grammy Award for Best Country Album